Drake Hotel may refer to:

in Canada
Drake Hotel (Toronto), Ontario

in the United States (by state)
Drake Hotel (Chicago, Illinois), listed on the National Register of Historic Places (NRHP)
Drake Hotel (Gallup, New Mexico), NRHP-listed in McKinley County
Drake Hotel (New York City), New York
Drake Hotel (Philadelphia, Pennsylvania), NRHP-listed